Janne Juhani Mertanen (born 28 August 1967 in Joensuu, Finland) is a Finnish classical pianist.

Life and career
Janne Mertanen has studied at the Joensuu Conservatory as a student of Matti Haapasalo and at the Sibelius Academy where his teachers included Erik Thomas Tawaststjerna and Dmitri Bashkirov.  He then completed his studies with Lazar Berman at the Accademia Pianistica in Imola, Italy. He made his debut at Wigmore Hall in London in 1994 with a Chopin program. In March 2010, he made his South American debut as the soloist of Schumann’s piano concerto with the Orchestra of the National Theater of Brazil. In 2014, he made his solo debut in Japan with the Tokyo New City Orchestra. Janne Mertanen is best known for his performances and recordings of Frederic Chopin.

Early life
When Janne Mertanen was a child, he initially wanted to become a tennis player. However at the age of 12 he started to play piano and decided to made it his career.

Discography
Most of Mertanen's recordings are published either by Sony Classical or Finnish label Alba Records.

 Sibelius: Finnish Folk Songs & Discoveries. Sony Classical 2021
 Kaski: Yö meren rannalla, Heino Kaski Piano Works. Alba 2018
 Palmgren: Piano Concertos 4-5, Pori Sinfonietta-Jan Söderblom. Alba 2017
 Sibelius: Piano Works 5 cd. Sony Classical 2015
 Grieg/Schumann: Piano Concertos, Gävle Symphony Orchestra-Hannu Koivula. Alba 2013
 Chopin: Grand Chopin, Works for piano & Orchestra. Turku Philharmonic-Jani Telaranta. Alba 2011
 Nino Rota: Piano Concertos e & C / Tampere Philharmonic-Hannu Lintu. Alba 2010
 Sibelius: Piano Works. Presence Records 2010
 Chopin: Piano Concertos 1 & 2 / Joensuu City Orchestra-Hannu Koivula. Alba 2008
 Chopin: Nocturnes vol.2 Alba 2003 ("Grand Prix du Disque Frederic Chopin" - award, Warsaw 2005)
 Chopin: Nocturnes vol.1 Alba 2001 ("Grand Prix du Disque Frederic Chopin" - award, Warsaw 2005)
 Romantic Finnish Piano (Madetoja, Sibelius etc) Macedonia Records 2001
 Chopin: 10 Mazurkas, 3 Etudes etc. Alba 2000
 Kokkonen: Piano Works. Alba 1998
 Satie: Satierik - Piano Works. Alba 1997
 Chopin Recital. Finlandia Records 1994

Competitions
International Chopin Competition Darmstadt, 1992, 1st place
Nyborg Nordic Piano Competition (Denmark), 1992, 1st place

References

External links
jannemertanen.com — official website

1967 births
People from Joensuu
Finnish classical pianists
Sibelius Academy alumni
Living people
21st-century classical pianists